Carl Georg Rogberg (6 August 1789 in Växjö - 28 January 1834 in Uppsala) was a Swedish priest and university teacher. Rogberg matriculated at Uppsala University in 1807 and studied at the faculty of theology where he graduated in 1818. He started to take seminaries to become a vicar at Heliga Trefaldighets congregation in Uppsala in 1823. In 1828 he became a member of the Bible commission, which was working on a new translation of the Bible into Swedish and in 1831 he became professor of pastoral theology in Uppsala.

References

People from Växjö
1789 births
1834 deaths
19th-century Swedish Lutheran priests
Swedish theologians
Uppsala University alumni